Jonathan Terell Ford (born September 29, 1998) is an American football nose tackle for the Green Bay Packers of the National Football League (NFL). He played college football at Miami.

Professional career
Ford was selected by the Green Bay Packers in the seventh round (234th overall) of the 2022 NFL Draft. He signed his rookie contract on May 6, 2022. He made the Packers' initial 53-man roster following his first training camp, but remained inactive for the entire 2022 season.

References

External links
Green Bay Packers bio
Miami Hurricanes bio

Living people
1998 births
American football defensive tackles
Miami Hurricanes football players
Players of American football from Fort Lauderdale, Florida
Green Bay Packers players